Sitabamba District is one of eight districts of the province Santiago de Chuco in Peru.

References